A Luta Continua (Portuguese for The Struggle Continues) is a studio album by Big Youth that was released in 1986.

Track listing
All tracks composed by Herbie Miller and Manley Buchanan
 "Survival Plan"
 "Sing Another Song"
 "Feel It"
 "Weatherman"
 "Rock Johnny Roll"
 "KKK"
 "Bush Mama"
 "Action"
 "A Luta Continua"
 "Song Of Praise"

Personnel
 Big Youth – Vocals,
 Robbie Shakespeare – Bass
 Robby Lynn – Keyboards
 Skully – Drums, Repeater
 Leroy Sibbles – Background Vocals
 Aston Barrett – Bass
 Cedric Brooks -Tenor Saxophone
 Buchanan – Arranger
 Anthony "Bunny" Graham – Tom Tom
 Sly Dunbar – Drums
 Dean Fraser – Alto & Tenor Saxophone
 Chris "Sky Juice" Blake – Percussion
 Willie Lindo – Guitar
 The Tamlins – Background Vocals
 Byard Lancaster – Baritone Saxophone

Recording Information
 Recording : Harry J Studio, Kingston, Jamaica & Joe Gibbs Studio, Kingston, Jamaica
 Engineer : Errol Thompson

References

References

1986 albums
Big Youth albums
Caroline Records albums